Shine is the debut studio album by the English classical crossover singer-songwriter Mary-Jess Leaverland. It was originally released in August 2011, on the label Decca. The album follows her victory on Chinese television talent contest Min Xing Chang Fan Tian in December 2009. Leaverland described the album's sound as a "True hybrid between Classical and Pop with a filmic element and an Oriental thread".

Release history
The album's debut single, "Are You the Way Home?" was released on 17 April 2011, and was co-written by Leaverland herself and English singer-songwriter Helen Boulding. One week prior to the release of second single "Glorious", Leaverland released a four-track EP of the same name which featured both singles; the Min Xing Chang Fan Tian winner's song, "Yue Guang Ai Ren (A Love Before Time)"; and an album track, "Stand as One". The third single "Heaven Is Empty" was released onto iTunes on 29 July 2011. The album peaked at #57 in the UK. Shine won both 'Best Newcomer' and 'Best Album' from classical-crossover.co.uk and was awarded many 5 star reviews.

Track listing

References

External links

2011 debut albums
Decca Records albums